Anderson Road may refer to:
 Anderson Road, Hong Kong
 Anderson Road (Calgary)
 Anderson Road, New Brunswick, Canada, a settlement located along Route 380
 Anderson Road, Gloucester, Ontario, Canada (Ottawa Road 27)